Edmund Isham D.D. (1744?–1817) was an academic administrator at the University of Oxford.

Isham was elected Warden (head) of All Souls College, Oxford in 1793, a post he held until his death in 1817.
While Warden at All Souls College, Isham was also Vice-Chancellor of Oxford University from 1797 until 1798.

A portrait of Isham was painted by William Owen (1769–1825) and a mezzotint engraving was produced by Samuel William Reynolds  (1773–1835) in 1810.

See also
 Euseby Isham, Rector of Lincoln College, Oxford, 1731–55

References

1744 births
1817 deaths
Wardens of All Souls College, Oxford
Vice-Chancellors of the University of Oxford